Mohammad Reza Barari (born 31 March 1988 in Sari, Mazandaran) is an Iranian weightlifter. He competed at the 2013 World Championships in the Men's 105 kg, winning the bronze medal in clean and jerk.

Barari won a gold medal at the 2016 Asian Weightlifting championships in Uzbekistan and in an interview with Tehran Times, Barari said, "I am so happy since I made the Iranian people happy and I want to make them happy once again this time in the 2016 Summer Olympics". He finished in 6th place at the 2016 Summer Olympics.

Major results

References

External links
 
 
 
 

1988 births
Living people
Iranian male weightlifters
Iranian sportspeople in doping cases
Olympic weightlifters of Iran
Weightlifters at the 2016 Summer Olympics
Weightlifters at the 2018 Asian Games
Asian Games competitors for Iran
Islamic Solidarity Games medalists in weightlifting
Sportspeople from Sari, Iran
20th-century Iranian people
21st-century Iranian people
Islamic Solidarity Games competitors for Iran